Grímur is a Faroese and Icelandic masculine given name. People bearing the name Grímur include:
Grímur Geitskör (fl. 10th-century), responsible for establishing the Icelandic parliament Althing 
Grímur Hákonarson (born 1977), Icelandic film director and screenwriter
Grímur Jónsson Thorkelin (1752–1829), Icelandic–Danish scholar
Grímur Kamban (fl. 8th or 9th-century), first man to set foot in the Faroe Islands
Grímur Thomsen (1820–1896), Icelandic poet and editor

References

Faroese masculine given names
Icelandic masculine given names